Dakshin Gujarat Vij Company Ltd. is an electricity company that was incorporated on 15 September 2003 by Gujarat Electricity Board (GEB). The Company obtained the Certificate of the Commencement of Business on 15 October 2007. The company was one of several created as a part of efforts towards restructuring of the power sector in the state of Gujarat in India.

Description 

DGVCL, Surat. The company is involved in electricity sub-transmission distribution and retail supply in the State of Gujarat or outside the State. Their mandate is to establish and use a power system network and to buy and sell electrical energy, and to collect information with an eye towards further system improvements.

The Gujarat Electricity Industry (Re-Organization & Regulation) Act 2003 paved the way for comprehensive reform and restructuring of the State Electricity Board with an aim to restructure the Electricity Industry in a manner that will ensure the long term viability and sustainability of the power sector in the state. As a part of the  reform process, the  GEB was disaggregated into several autonomous entities.

The Electricity Act 2003 introduced competition by way of open access in the transmission and distribution of electricity. The Act also provided for reorganization of the Electricity Boards through appropriate transfer schemes being formulated by the state governments. The Government of Gujarat reorganized the GEB functionally into a Generation Company, a Transmission Company and four Distribution Companies. Thereby Dakshin Gujarat Vij Company Limited became functional on 1 April 2005.

See also
 Gujarat Urja Vikas Nigam Limited GUVNL
 Gujarat State Electricity Corporation Limited GSEC
 Gujarat Energy Transmission Corporation limited Getco
 State Load Dispatch Center SLDC
 Madhya Gujarat Vij Company Limited MGVCL
 Paschim Gujarat Vij Company Limited PGVCL
 Uttar Gujarat Vij Company Limited UGVCL
 Gujarat Energy Training and Research Institute GETRI

External links
 www.dgvcl.com
 www.gseb.com

Electric power distribution network operators in India
State electricity agencies of Gujarat
Energy companies established in 2003
2003 establishments in Gujarat
Indian companies established in 2003